The 42 Martyrs of Amorium were a group of Byzantine senior officials taken prisoner by the Abbasid Caliphate in the Sack of Amorium in 838 and executed in 845, after refusing to convert to Islam. They are commemorated by the Roman Catholic Church and the Eastern Orthodox Church on March 6. Amorium is located at Hisar, Turkey.

Events 
In 838, the Abbasid caliph al-Mu'tasim() led a major campaign against the Byzantine Empire that ended in the sack of the city of Amorium, the capital of the Anatolic Theme and birthplace of the reigning Byzantine Amorian dynasty.

Following the sack, 42 officers and notables of Amorium were taken as hostages to Samarra, then the capital of the Abbasid Caliphate. Repeated efforts by Emperor Theophilos and, after his death in 842, by Michael III and Empress-regent Theodora, to ransom them were rebuffed by the caliphs. After refusing to convert to Islam, they were executed at Samarra on 6 March 845. Only a few of the 42 are known by name:
 , a court eunuch and possibly  (military governor) of the Bucellarian Theme, regarded as the leader of the 42 in the hagiographic texts.
 the  Theophilos, otherwise unknown.
 the  Constantine Baboutzikos, husband of Empress Theodora's sister and thereby apparently the highest-ranking of the prisoners. He was the first to be proposed to convert to Islam, and possibly also the first to be executed after refusing.
 Bassoes, identified as a "runner", otherwise unknown.
 Kallistos, possibly a member of the Melissenos family.
 Constantine, secretary ( or ) of Constantine Baboutzikos.

Hagiography and veneration 
The hagiography of the 42 was written soon after their execution, by the monk, Euodios, who used their fate and the sack of Amorium as an indictment of and proof of divine retribution against the re-adoption of Iconoclasm by Emperor Theophilos. Euodios' narrative mostly contains theological discussions between the steadfast prisoners and various people—Byzantine defectors, Muslim officials, etc.—sent to convince them to convert during their seven-year imprisonment. Their execution was then carried out by Ethiopian slaves on the banks of the Euphrates. Euodios' hagiography is the "last example of the genre of collective martyrdom", and was widely disseminated, with several variants of the legend of the 42 Martyrs appearing in later authors. 

The feast day of the 42 Martyrs is on 6 March, the day of their execution. Pictorial representations of the 42 are rare in Byzantine art, unlike their analogues, the 40 Martyrs of Sebaste; when they are depicted, they are represented simply as a group of officials in court dress.

References

Sources 
 
 
 

845 deaths
9th-century Byzantine people
9th-century Christian martyrs
9th-century executions by the Abbasid Caliphate
Groups of Christian martyrs of the Middle Ages
Byzantine people of the Arab–Byzantine wars
Byzantine prisoners of war
Christians executed for refusing to convert to Islam
Christian saints killed by Muslims
Byzantine saints of the Eastern Orthodox Church
Prisoners and detainees of the Abbasid Caliphate
Executed Byzantine people
Groups of Eastern Orthodox saints
845
Amorium